Pappelstadion is a multi-use stadium in Mattersburg, Austria.  It is currently used mostly for football matches and was the home ground of SV Mattersburg.  The stadium holds 15,700 spectators since its most recent renovation and is named for the numerous populus trees surrounding the stands.

References

SV Mattersburg
Football venues in Austria
Sports venues in Burgenland